In 1630 the Dutch captured Recife, in Portuguese Brazil. This began a war over Brazil, which would see the Dutch establish a colony called New Holland and end with the Portuguese taking all of their captured possessions back.

Notes

References

Klein, Herbert S. African slavery in Latin America and the Caribbean (2007)
Jaques, Tony Dictionary of Battles and Sieges: A Guide to 8,500 Battles from Antiquity through the Twenty-first Century (2006)

Military history of Brazil
History of the Netherlands
Recife (1630)
Recife (1630)
Conflicts in 1630
17th century in Brazil
1630 in South America
Sieges of the Dutch–Portuguese War
Recife